Before We Go is a 2014 American romantic drama film directed by Chris Evans in his directorial debut. It stars Evans (who also co-produced) and Alice Eve as two strangers stuck in Manhattan, New York City, for the night.

The film had its world premiere in the Special Presentations section of the 39th Toronto International Film Festival on September 12, 2014. It was released on video on demand on July 21, 2015, and had a limited theatrical release in the United States on September 4, 2015.

Plot
While busking in Grand Central Terminal, Nick Vaughan (Chris Evans) sees a woman, Brooke Dalton (Alice Eve), drop her phone while running to catch a train. She misses the train and returns to the station where Nick returns her broken phone. When he finds her standing outside the terminal she confesses that she has just been robbed and is trapped in the city. He offers to pay for a cab to take her to Boston but his debit card is declined and his credit card has expired. When he tries to call a friend to come lend him the money he finds his phone has died. Nick offers to try to pay for a room for Brooke for the night, but she insists that she needs to reach Boston by morning.

Nick decides to help Brooke find her missing purse. They are able to track it down at a sweatshop that deals in stolen purses. Nick heads inside to retrieve the purse while Brooke uses a payphone to call her husband. After using the phone, she then gets a couple of police officers passing by to investigate the building Nick is in. The sweatshop owners get spooked, punch Nick, and run out along with the bag. Nick and Brooke then head for the wedding of a friend of Nick's, hoping to borrow money. Along the way, Nick and Brooke open up more about why they're in New York. Brooke had just sold a painting and was going to surprise her husband by coming home early. Nick has an audition for a band that he has wanted to play with for a while. Instead of ending up at the wedding, they stumble upon an event where they are mistaken for members of the band. Nick and Brooke perform "My Funny Valentine" and flee when the real band shows up. After their last-ditch attempt to get a bus to Boston fails for lack of funds, Brooke borrows a man's phone, calls a friend, and begs her to retrieve a letter she has left for her husband that she does not want him to read.

Elated that her problem is now solved, Brooke offers to go to Nick's friend's wedding and pretend to be his girlfriend in front of his ex, Hannah. At the reception, Nick sees Hannah, but after being introduced to her new boyfriend, he leaves abruptly. Outside, Nick tells Brooke that this was the first time he had seen Hannah since she rejected his marriage proposal and broke up with him six years ago. At Brooke's insistence, Nick goes back to speak to Hannah and discovers that she is pregnant and that their relationship is truly over. Wandering around the city, the two find a psychic who is still open. After he reads her future, he allows Brooke to use his phone and she learns her friend could not get into her home to retrieve the letter.

After they leave the psychic, Brooke reveals to Nick that she discovered that her husband was cheating on her. Though he ended the relationship, she discovered that he was going to see his mistress again. Devastated, she wrote him a letter ending the marriage and went to New York for work. However, during her trip she received a phone call from her husband saying he was coming home early and realized that he had ended the relationship with his mistress for good.

At a restaurant, Nick tells Brooke that her husband will most likely understand why she wrote him the letter and that if he doesn't, that's that. Brooke, worried about the possible end of her marriage, sneaks out the back of the restaurant and tries to hail a cab to the airport to fly to her mother's in Indiana. Nick appears, frustrated that she tried to bail on him, and they argue about their relationships. They then go to Nick's friend's hotel room. Together, they unwind from the night's adventures. They then share a kiss, write on the back of paintings in the room (a reference to an earlier encounter with a painting with erotic writing on the back of it) and reflect on their night.

In the morning, they return to the train station where they are about to part. Nick picks up a phone from a phone booth and, like an earlier joke, uses it as a "time machine" and pretends to call himself in the past, saying that he will meet a woman and "you will need her more than she needs you". They share one last kiss and finally depart. On her way home, Brooke finds a guest service paper that she and Nick filled out at the hotel. On the bottom it says, "Turn over". After reading what was on the back, she smiles.

Cast 
Chris Evans as Nick Vaughan
Alice Eve as Brooke Dalton
Emma Fitzpatrick as Hannah Dempsey
Mark Kassen as Danny 
Daniel Spink as Tyler
Elijah Moreland as Cole
John Cullum as Harry
Scott Evans as Concierge

Production 
The film, originally titled 1:30 Train, was first announced in August 2013, when Chris Evans signed on to star, as well as make his directorial debut. In October Alice Eve signed on to play the female lead.

Filming began in December 2013 in Manhattan's Lower East Side and lasted for 19 days.

In July 2014, it was announced that the film would premiere at the 2014 Toronto International Film Festival, and that the title had been changed to Before We Go.

The film is scored by Chris Westlake.

Release
The film had its world premiere at the 2014 Toronto International Film Festival on September 12, 2014. Prior to the premiere it was announced Radius-TWC had acquired all distribution rights to the film. The film then went on to screen at the Seattle International Film Festival on May 22, 2015. The film was released on video on demand on July 21, 2015, and in theaters in a limited release on September 4, 2015.

Home media
Before We Go was released on DVD and Blu-ray on November 3, 2015 and was added to Netflix Instant Streaming on March 1, 2016.

Reception
On review aggregator website Rotten Tomatoes, the film holds an approval rating of 27% based on 30 reviews, with an average rating of 2.7/10. The site's critics consensus reads, "Chris Evans' directorial debut is modest to a fault, with a threadbare story and minimal style leaving his and Alice Eve's likable performances adrift in New York City with nowhere to go." Metacritic assigned the film a weighted average score of 31 out of 100, based on 10 critics, indicating "generally unfavorable reviews".

Soundtrack

References

External links 
 
 

2014 films
2014 directorial debut films
2014 independent films
2014 romantic drama films
American independent films
American romantic drama films
Films directed by Chris Evans
Films produced by McG
Films set in Manhattan
Films shot in New York City
Films with screenplays by Ronald Bass
Wonderland Sound and Vision films
2010s English-language films
2010s American films